The First United Methodist Church of Oviedo, is a historic church in Oviedo, Florida, United States. It is located at 263 King Street. On July 18, 2007, it was added to the U.S. National Register of Historic Places.

References

External links
 First United Methodist Church of Oviedo website

United Methodist churches in Florida
National Register of Historic Places in Seminole County, Florida
Churches in Seminole County, Florida